Comberton Village College is an 11–18 mixed secondary school and sixth form with academy status on the edge of Comberton village in Cambridge, Cambridgeshire. It opened in 1960 as a village college.

History    
The school was first opened in 1960 by Henry Morris, where it was opened to 330 children and 11 teaching staff. In 1974, the school became fully comprehensive and, in April 1993, it became grant-maintained. It changed to a Foundation School and has recently become a Foundation School with a Trust: the recently formed Comberton Educational Trust. The school was granted a presumption to open a new sixth form due to its high-performing status. Capital funding from the Learning and Skills Council was secured to build the required new facilities for a sixth form. The sixth form department of the college opened in September 2011. The new sixth form building was opened  by Sir David Bell, permanent secretary for the Department for Education on 14 June 2011.

In February 2011, Comberton Village College became an academy, operated by the Cam Academy Trust. The trust also operates Cambourne Village College which opened in Cambourne in September 2013, and Melbourn Village College in Melbourn, St Peter's School, Hartford Infant and Junior Schools in Huntingdon, Gamlingay First School and Jeavons Wood Primary School in Cambourne. The Gamlingay Village College joined the trust in September 2017.

In January 2016, Comberton Village College were featured in the ITV news for providing teaching resources to Edlumino in order to support the education of refugees in France.

In 2022, the college installed a ground source heat pump , as a ‘first’ in the UK.

Standards

The College retained "Outstanding" status from Ofsted in February 2013. A recent "section 8" monitoring inspection confirmed the excellent standards at the College. In 2014, 77% of GCSE students achieved 5 A*-C grades (including English and Maths) and 66% of all A-level grades were A*-B.

References

External links
 

Academies in Cambridgeshire
Secondary schools in Cambridgeshire
Educational institutions established in 1960
1960 establishments in England
Village College